Manuel Luís dos Santos (born 5 February 1943) aka Carriço, is a former Portuguese footballer who played as a defender.

External links 
 
 

1943 births
Living people
Portuguese footballers
Association football defenders
Primeira Liga players
Vitória F.C. players
Portugal international footballers